Falcon Island is a 1981 Australian children's television series set in Western Australia which screened on the Nine Network. The series also aired in the United Kingdom on the ITV network in 1984, and was repeated on Channel 4 in 1986.

Cast
 Alan Cassell as Jack Brady
 Bill Kerr as Madden
 Francesca Shoesmith as Kate Ellery
 Greg Duffy as Paul Ellery
 Justin Hollyock as Jock Dixon
 Bevan Lee as Vim Van Dorn
 Maurie Ogden as Frank Ellery
 Michael Loney as Constable Harris
 Joan Sydney as Mrs. Yates
 Merrin Canning as Vicky Fitzgerald
 Barrie Barkla as Jarvis
 Ian Fletcher as Alan

References

External links

Falcon Island at Australian Television

Nine Network original programming
Australian children's television series
1981 Australian television series debuts